TMA-1 may refer to:
 TMA-1 mine, a circular, plastic-cased Yugoslavian minimum metal anti-tank blast mine
 Soyuz TMA-1, a Russian space exploration mission
 TMA-1 (Tycho Magnetic Anomaly - 1), the fictional Monolith (Space Odyssey) found in the moon's Tycho Crater in the novel and film 2001: A Space Odyssey 
 3,4,5 - Trimethoxyamphetamine (also called TMA), a psychedelic drug